Sadamu Uriu(20/09/1929 - 30/11/2020) was the Honor President of the Brazilian Shotokan Karate Confederation (CBKS), and the man responsible for first introducing karate into Brazil. He represents the Japan Karate Shotorenmei, Tetsuhiko Asai's organization, in Brazil.

References

External links
 Confederação Brasileira de Karate Shotokan
 Academia NKK
 Japan Karate Shoto Federation

Living people
Brazilian male karateka
Shotokan practitioners
Year of birth missing (living people)